The 1956 Mississippi State Maroons football team represented Mississippi State College during the 1956 NCAA University Division football season. The Maroons finished 4–6 in head coach Wade Walker's first season.

Schedule

References

Mississippi State
Mississippi State Bulldogs football seasons
Mississippi State Maroons football